The Bogle-Walker House was a historic house in Sudbury, Massachusetts. The house, built c. 1806, was the centerpiece of a farm that remained in the same family's hands until the 1980s. It was stylistically a Georgian house, showing how 18th century styles persisted into the early 19th century in rural areas. The house was listed on the National Register of Historic Places in 1992.

The farmland on which the house sat has since been subdivided into house lots and the house itself was dismantled.

See also
National Register of Historic Places listings in Middlesex County, Massachusetts

References

Houses on the National Register of Historic Places in Middlesex County, Massachusetts
Buildings and structures in Sudbury, Massachusetts
Demolished buildings and structures in Massachusetts
Houses completed in 1806
Georgian architecture in Massachusetts